Kondratovo is the name of several rural localities in Russia:

Kondratovo, Perm Krai, village in Permsky District, Perm Krai
Kondratovo, Babayevsky District, Vologda Oblast, village in Babayevsky District, Vologda Oblast
Kondratovo, Kichmengsko-Gorodetsky District, Vologda Oblast, village in Kichmengsko-Gorodetsky District, Vologda Oblast